Tumey v. Ohio, 273 U.S. 510 (1927), is a US Supreme Court case, concerning the due process of judicial disqualification. The court struck down an Ohio law that financially rewarded public officials for successfully prosecuting cases related to Prohibition. The court's decision in this case continues to provide precedent today in many cases involving judicial impartiality.

Background
The mayor of the village of North College Hill, Ohio received $12 for every defendant convicted before him. Ed Tumey was convicted before the mayor of unlawfully possessing intoxicating liquor.

Opinion of the Court
The court held that Tumey's conviction violated the Fourteenth Amendment, reasoning that it "deprives a defendant in a criminal case of due process of law to subject his liberty or property to the judgment of a court, the judge of which has a direct, personal, substantial pecuniary interest in reaching a conclusion against him in his case."

See also
List of United States Supreme Court cases, volume 273
Caperton v. A.T. Massey Coal Co.

References

Kastenberg, Joshua E., Chief Justice William Howard Taft's Conception of Judicial Integrity: The Legal History of Tumey v. Ohio (2017). Cleveland State Law Review. Available at SSRN: https://ssrn.com/abstract=2959072

External links

United States Supreme Court cases
United States Supreme Court cases of the Taft Court
1927 in United States case law